William Louis Hassamaer (July 26, 1864 – May 25, 1910), was a former professional baseball player who played outfielder in the Major Leagues from 1894 to 1896. He played for the Louisville Colonels and Washington Senators.

See also
 List of Major League Baseball players to hit for the cycle

External links
, or Retrosheet

1864 births
1910 deaths
Major League Baseball outfielders
Baseball players from Missouri
19th-century baseball players
Louisville Colonels players
Washington Senators (1891–1899) players
Kansas City Cowboys (minor league) players
Kansas City Blues (baseball) players
Galveston Sand Crabs players
Waco Babies players
Waco Texans players
Minneapolis Millers (baseball) players
Sacramento Senators players
San Francisco Friscos players
San Francisco Metropolitans players
Los Angeles Seraphs players
Seattle Hustlers players
Montgomery Colts players
Newark Colts players
Columbus Buckeyes (minor league) players
Columbus Senators players
Grand Rapids Rippers players
Grand Rapids Gold Bugs players
Toledo Mud Hens players
Bridgeport Orators players
Youngstown Puddlers players
Milwaukee Creams players